The 1997 World Table Tennis Championships mixed doubles was the 44th edition of the mixed doubles championship.

Liu Guoliang and Wu Na defeated Kong Linghui and Deng Yaping in the final by three sets to one.

Results

See also
List of World Table Tennis Championships medalists

References

-